The FIFA International Match Calendar (sometimes abbreviated as the FIFA Calendar or FIFA Days) is an outline agreement between FIFA, the six continental football confederations, the European Club Association, and FIFPro, which sets out which dates can be used for "official" and "friendly" men's international matches. 

The current dates are within five windows: in March, May or June, August or September, October, and November. The match calendar also determines when international competitions such as the AFC Asian Cup, Africa Cup of Nations, Copa América, CONCACAF Gold Cup, OFC Nations Cup, UEFA European Championship, and FIFA World Cup can take place.

Official matches have a release period of four days, which means that players can take up to four days away from club duties to partake in national team duties. If a player participates in an official match on a different continent from his club's, the release period is five days. Friendly matches are deemed less important and the release period is 48 hours.

FIFA insist that official and friendly matches take precedence over domestic matches. However, they state that international friendlies that take place outside the designated dates do not.

Upcoming match windows

Men's International Match Calendar

Women's International Match Calendar
The women's international match calendar sets out which dates can be used for "official" and "friendly" women's international matches. 

The current dates are within six windows: in February or March, April, June or July, September, October, and November.

Notes

References

External links
FIFA Calendar 

FIFA
Specific calendars